Vereide Church is a medieval parish church of the Church of Norway in Gloppen Municipality in Vestland county, Norway. It is the only stone church in the Nordfjord region. It is located in the village of Vereide, along the eastern coast of the Gloppefjorden. It is one of the four churches for the Gloppen parish which is part of the Nordfjord prosti (deanery) in the Diocese of Bjørgvin. The white, stone church was built in a long church style in the 12th century by an unknown architect. The church seats about 460 people.

History
The earliest existing historical records of the church date back to the year 1303, but the church was not new at that time. The church is a stone long church that was likely built in the 12th century, possibly in 1163 (this year is inscribed in an archway within the building). It originally had a rectangular nave and a narrower chancel with a lower roof line. This is the oldest surviving stone church in the Nordfjord region of Norway, and it was one of the original four churches built in the Nordfjord-Sunnfjord region (with the others being Eid Church, Kinn Church, and Askvoll Church). The church was extensively remodeled in 1631 and a few times since then.

In 1814, this church served as an election church. Together with more than 300 other parish churches across Norway, it was a polling station for elections to the 1814 Norwegian Constituent Assembly which wrote the Constitution of Norway. This was Norway's first national elections. Each church parish was a constituency that elected people called "electors" who later met together in each county to elect the representatives for the assembly that was to meet in Eidsvoll later that year.

In 1861, larger windows were installed. In 1879, a new wooden church porch with a tower was added. In 1904, the long-disused medieval soapstone baptismal font was found and re-installed in the church. It is the only remaining item of medieval origin that is still in use in the church. In 1931, a new chancel and sacristy were built. During the 1960s, the sacristy was enlarged.

Media gallery

See also
List of churches in Bjørgvin

References

Gloppen
Churches in Vestland
Long churches in Norway
Stone churches in Norway
12th-century churches in Norway
12th-century establishments in Norway
Norwegian election church